Elizabeth Moberly is a British research psychologist and theologian. Moberly is the author of Homosexuality: A New Christian Ethic, in which she suggests several possible causes of male homosexuality and a therapeutic cure.

Moberly was involved in ministry to homosexuals as Director of Psychosexual Education and Therapy for BCM International. She subsequently became involved in cancer research.

Bibliography
 Suffering, Innocent and Guilty (1978), S.P.C.K.
 Psychogenesis: The Early Development of Gender Identity (1983), Routledge and Kegan Paul.
 Homosexuality: A New Christian Ethic (1983), James Clarke & Co. ; 
 The Psychology of Self and Other (1985), Tavistock Publications. ;

References

External links
Moberly, Elizabeth, Book Review: Theological Ethics, The Expository Times, Vol. 94, No 10 (1983): 314.
A Study of Psychological Insights,  http://humanumreview.com/articles/moberly-a-study-of-psychological-insights

Sexual orientation change efforts
Living people
Year of birth missing (living people)
British psychologists
20th-century British non-fiction writers
20th-century British women writers